Adonara is an island in the Lesser Sunda Islands of Indonesia, located east of the larger island of Flores in the Solor Archipelago. To the east lies Lembata, formerly known as Lomblen.  Adonara is the highest of the islands of the archipelago, reaching an altitude of 1,659 metres, and it has an area of 529.75 km2. It is situated in the East Flores Regency of East Nusa Tenggara province.

Administration 
The island is divided into eight districts (kecamatan), tabulated below with their areas (in km2) and their populations at the 2010 Census and 2020 census, together with the official estimates as at mid 2021.

Note: (a) Adonara District covers only the northern part of Adonara Island ("Adonara Utara").

History

Local history on Adonara is documented from the sixteenth century, when Portuguese traders and missionaries established a post on the nearby island of Solor. By that time Adonara and the surrounding islands were ritually divided between a population of coastal dwellers known as Paji, and a population mainly settling the mountainous inland called Demon. The Paji were susceptible to Islam, while the Demon tended to fall under Portuguese influence. The Paji areas on Adonara contained three principalities, namely Adonara proper (centered on the north coast of the island), and Terong and Lamahala (on the south coast). Together with two principalities on Solor (Lohayong and Lamakera), they constituted a league called Watan Lema ("the five shores"). The Watan Lema allied with the Dutch East India Company (VOC) in 1613, confirmed in 1646. The Adonara principalities had frequent feuds with the Portuguese in Larantuka on Flores, and were not always obedient to the Dutch authorities.
In the course of the nineteenth century, the ruler of Adonara (proper) in the north strengthened his position in the Solor Archipelago; by then, he was also the overlord of parts of eastern Flores and Lembata. The Demon areas stood under the suzerainty of the principality of Larantuka, which in turn was under Portuguese rule until 1859, when it was ceded to the Netherlands. The principalities of Larantuka and Adonara (proper) were abolished by the Indonesian government in 1962. Some post-independence local officials trace their roots to past rulers, called raja, of Adonara (proper).  These include:

Foramma, c. 1650
Boli I, c. 1671–1684
Eke 1684–1688 (killed by mountain people)
Gogok, c. 1702
Wuring (brother of Eke), 1688–1719
Boli II (son of Wuring), 1719-after 1756
unknown rulers
Jou, c. 1815
Lakabella Jou (son of Jou), c. 1832
Begu, d. July 28, 1850 (killed)
 (son of Begu), 1850–1857
Jou (brother of Pela), 1857–1868
Kamba Begu (brother of Lakabella), 1868–1893
Bapa Tuan (son of Kamba Begu), temporary Raja in 1893 for 6 months
Arkiang Kamba (Arakang; brother of Bapa Tuan, b. 1866), 1893 or 1894 – abdicated December 18, 1930
Bapa Ana (son of a sister of Kamba Begu), Regent with the title of Kapitan 1930 – December 1, 1935, condemned to life imprisonment 1935 and sent to Kupang
Bapa Nuhur, (son of Gela, a son of Bapa Tuan, b. 1915), 1941–1947
Bapa Kaya, (son of Bapa Ana, d. 12/1/1954), Regent 1947–1951
Mohamad Eke (great-grandson of Raja Jo, 1929 – c. 1985), 1951–1962, first referred as Government Asst during Bapa Kaya's rule and also Kapitan of Adonara

Geography
Adonara Island is a part of the Indonesian regency of East Flores. It can be reached by airplane from Jakarta to Kupang, then by ferry to Larantuka, then by boat.

The administrative centre of Adonara is the town of Waiwerang.

Notes

References

P. Arndt (1938), 'Demon und Padzi, die feindlichen Brüder des Solor-Archipelags', Anthropos 33.
Robert H. Barnes (1995), 'Lamakera, Solor: Ethnohistory of a Muslim Whaling Village of Eastern Indonesia', Anthropos 90.
Robert H. Barnes (2004), 'The murder of Sengaji Begu: A turning point in Dutch involvement in the Solor Archipelago', Masyarakat Indonesia 30:2
Benno M. Biermann (1924), 'Die alte Dominikanermission auf den Solorinseln', Zeitschrift für Missionswissenschaft 14.
Arend de Roever (2002), De jacht op sandelhout: De VOC en de tweedeling van Timor in de zeventiende eeuw. Zutphen: Walburg Pers.

Solor Archipelago
Landforms of East Nusa Tenggara
Populated places in Indonesia
Islands of Indonesia